During the 2003–04 Spanish football season, Barcelona competed in La Liga, Copa del Rey and UEFA Cup.

Season summary
After the disappointment of the Joan Gaspart era, the combination of a new young president Joan Laporta and a new manager, former Dutch and Milan star Frank Rijkaard, saw Barcelona bounce back. Guided by new management off the pitch and the likes of future FIFA World Player of the Year Ronaldinho on the pitch, Barça achieved second place behind Valencia in the league.

Barcelona competed in the UEFA Cup rather than the UEFA Champions League for the first time since the 1995–96 season, given their sixth-place finish in 2002–03.

The BBC made a documentary, titled FC Barcelona Confidential, based on the turn of events in the league after Joan Laporta's entry. With his arrival, the club experienced a new style of management that returned the club into a positive cycle, with an inherited massive financial debt crisis was resolved. The season saw Barcelona's spectacular return to form, finishing second after being at the bottom of the table.

Squad
Source

In

Total spending:   €50.5 million

Out

Total income:  €3.15 million

Competitions

La Liga

League table

Results by Round

Matches

Copa del Rey

UEFA Cup

Statistics

Players statistics

Results

References

External links
 
 ESPNsoccernet: Barcelona Team Page 
 FC Barcelona (Spain) profile
 uefa.com - UEFA Champions League 
 Web Oficial de la Liga de Fútbol Profesional
 
 

FC Barcelona seasons
Barcelona